Ace Hotel Downtown Los Angeles, originally built as the California Petroleum Corporation Building and later known as the Texaco Building, is a , 13-story highrise hotel and theater building located at 937 South Broadway in downtown Los Angeles, California. It was the tallest building in the city for one year after its completion in 1927, and was the tallest privately owned structure in Los Angeles until 1956. Its style is Spanish Gothic, patterned after Segovia Cathedral in Segovia, Spain.

The building contains the historic United Artists Theatre, the flagship theater built for the United Artists motion picture studio. The theater was later used as a church by pastors Gene Scott and his widow Melissa Scott under the name "University Cathedral". In October 2011, Scott's Wescott Christian Center Inc. sold the building to Greenfield Partners, a real estate investment company located in Westport, Connecticut, for $11 million. It was converted to a hotel, and opened in 2014. The hotel is part of the Ace Hotels chain.

United Artists Theatre period

The theatre was designed by the architect C. Howard Crane of the firm Walker & Eisen for the United Artists film studio formed by D. W. Griffith, Charlie Chaplin, Douglas Fairbanks and Mary Pickford. The theater, a classic movie palace, was one of many constructed by United Artists and served as a major premier house. The theater occupies three floors of the 13-story building and has a 2,214-seat auditorium. Like many movie theaters, the seat rows sink in toward the front of the orchestra section, so ticket holders there must look up at the stage.

University Cathedral period

The building was first leased by televangelist Gene Scott in 1989, to be used as the location from which to broadcast the live Sunday services of his ministry. Scott held his first Sunday service there in 1990 and continued to hold Sunday services there until his death in 2005.  A designated historic monument in itself, the building was for many years topped by the historic "Jesus Saves" neon signs (originally from the Church of the Open Door). They were located in the rear lower roof, one facing the west and one north, until September 10, 2011, when one sign was removed by crane. The building was claimed to house the largest collection of Bibles in private hands. After leasing for thirteen years, Gene Scott purchased the building in 2002. Following Scott's death, services continued to be held at the Los Angeles University Cathedral by Melissa Scott, the widow of Gene Scott, with services broadcast over TV, shortwave radio, and the Internet.

Ace Hotel conversion
The building has been completely restored and renovated to serve as a luxury boutique hotel called Ace Hotel Downtown Los Angeles. It features 182 rooms, a pool, a restaurant and three bars, as well as the restored theatre. It opened on January 16, 2014. In December 2014, Greenfield Partners put the building up for sale, seeking about $100 million as the sale price.  In May 2015, Chesapeake Lodging Trust bought the building for $103 million.

The theater was restored as well and re-opened on February 14, 2014, with concerts by the British rock band Spiritualized. L.A. Dance Project, a dance company founded by choreographer Benjamin Millepied, will also take residence in the Theatre at Ace Hotel. Red Hot Chili Peppers performed a fundraiser at the Ace Hotel on February 5, 2016 in support of presidential candidate Bernie Sanders.

Broadway Theater Historic District
The building is a historic district contributing property in the Broadway Theater District on the National Register of Historic Places. It is also a Los Angeles Historic-Cultural Monument.

See also
 Broadway Theater District (Los Angeles) — NRHP Historic district.
 List of Los Angeles Historic-Cultural Monuments in Downtown Los Angeles
 United Artists Theatre Building (Detroit)

References

External links

 Ace Hotel Los Angeles
 Texaco Building — at You-Are-Here.com
 United Artists Building Exterior — at Public Art in Los Angeles

Movie palaces
Cinemas and movie theaters in Los Angeles
Buildings and structures in Downtown Los Angeles
Los Angeles Historic-Cultural Monuments
Historic district contributing properties in California
Event venues established in 1927
Hotel buildings completed in 1927
1927 establishments in California
Texaco
Music venues in Los Angeles
Gothic Revival architecture in California
Spanish Revival architecture in California
National Register of Historic Places in Los Angeles
Hotel buildings on the National Register of Historic Places in Los Angeles
Theatres on the National Register of Historic Places in Los Angeles
Skyscraper hotels in Los Angeles
Hotels in Los Angeles